Marvin Raeburn (born March 7, 1975) is a Trinidadian former footballer.

Playing career 
Raeburn played in the USISL A-League in 1998 with Raleigh Flyers. In 1999, he was traded to the Atlanta Silverbacks, and in 2001 he played in the TT Pro League with Morvant Caledonia United. He played abroad for the second time in 2003 with the Metro Lions in the Canadian Professional Soccer League.

International career 
Raeburn made his debut for the Trinidad and Tobago national football team on February 15, 1995, against Finland, where he recorded his first goal in a 2-1 victory. He made his final appearance for the national team in a friendly match on March 21, 1996, against Colombia.

References 

1975 births
Living people
Trinidad and Tobago international footballers
Trinidad and Tobago footballers
Raleigh Flyers players
Atlanta Silverbacks players
Morvant Caledonia United players
Brampton United players
A-League (1995–2004) players
TT Pro League players
Canadian Soccer League (1998–present) players
Association football midfielders